The men's team pursuit was a cycling event at the 1988 Summer Olympics in Seoul, South Korea which was held on 23 and 24 September 1988. There were a total number of 19 participating teams.

Qualification
4000 metre time trial, with the top 8 teams advancing.

Match round 

In the match round, the top 8 teams from the qualification round were matched together, 1 vs. 8, 2 vs. 7, 3 vs. 6 and 4 vs. 5 for the Quarterfinal. In the Quarterfinal, the winner of each match advanced to race in the Semifinals.

Quarterfinal 

Match 1

Match 2

Match 3

Match 4

Semifinal 

Match 1

Match 2

Finals 

Bronze Medal Match

Gold Medal Match

References

External links
 Official Report

Track cycling at the 1988 Summer Olympics
Cycling at the Summer Olympics – Men's team pursuit
Men's events at the 1988 Summer Olympics